George William Coleman (born February 1, 1939) is an American prelate of the Roman Catholic Church. Coleman served as bishop of the Diocese of Fall River in Massachusetts from 2003 to 2014.

Biography

Early life and education
George Coleman was born on February 1, 1939, to George and Beatrice (née Shea) Coleman in Fall River, Massachusetts; he has one sister, Eileen. Raised in Somerset, Massachusetts, he attended Village Elementary School and graduated from Monsignor James Coyle High School in Taunton, Massachusetts in 1957.

While studying at College of the Holy Cross in Worcester, Massachusetts, Coleman decided to enter the priesthood. He attended St. John's Seminary in Boston and then the Pontifical North American College in Rome.  Coleman completed his theological studies at the Pontifical Gregorian University in Rome, receiving a Licentiate in Theology.

Ordination and ministry
On December 16, 1964, Coleman was ordained to the priesthood in Rome by Bishop Francis Reh for the Diocese of Fall River.On returning to Massachusetts, Coleman served as associate pastor of St. Kilian's Parish in New Bedford, Massachusetts. In 1967, he was assigned to ministry at St. Louis Parish in Fall River and in 1972 to Our Lady of Victory Parish in Centerville, Massachusetts.

In 1977, Coleman was appointed director of the Diocesan Department of Education. He assumed the additional post in 1982 of pastor of St. Patrick's Parish in Fall River. From 1985 to 1994, Coleman served as pastor of Corpus Christi Parish in Sandwich, Massachusetts, concurrently serving as dean of the Cape Cod & Islands Deanery in the diocese from 1990 to 1994.

In 1994, Coleman was appointed vicar general and moderator of the curia of Fall River by then Bishop Seán O'Malley.  Coleman was also raised to the rank of honorary prelate of his holiness in 1994 by Pope John Paul II.When Bishop O'Malley was appointed in 2002 as bishop of the Diocese of Palm Beach, the pope chose Coleman to serve as diocesan administrator for the Diocese of Fall River.

Bishop of Fall River
On April 30, 2003, John Paul II appointed Coleman as the seventh bishop of the Diocese of Fall River. He was consecrated on July 22 2003 by Archbishop Gabriel Higuera, with Archbishop Daniel Cronin and Bishop O'Malley serving as co-consecrators.  For his episcopal motto, Coleman chose Letter to the Romans (14:8): "Domini sumus -- We are the Lord's".

On July 3, 2014, Pope Francis accepted Coleman's resignation as bishop of Fall River.

See also
 

 Catholic Church hierarchy
 Catholic Church in the United States
 Historical list of the Catholic bishops of the United States
 List of Catholic bishops of the United States
 Lists of patriarchs, archbishops, and bishops

References

External links
Diocese of Fall River

Episcopal succession

1939 births
Living people
 
Catholic Church in Massachusetts
Pontifical Gregorian University alumni
21st-century Roman Catholic bishops in the United States